The Museum of Independence in Dhaka, Bangladesh depicts the struggle for independence of Bangladesh. It shows the history of the nation since Mughal tenure to independence in 1971. It is the first and only underground museum in the country. The museum is part of a 67-acre complex at Suhrawardy Udyan, the site from where Sheikh Mujibur Rahman gave his historic speech declaring the struggle for independence, and where the Pakistani forces surrendered after the War of Liberation. The museum was opened to public on March 25, 2015, the 45th Independence Day of Bangladesh.

Architecture
The underground museum is part of a master plan that includes a multimedia projection theater, an amphitheater, three water pools, Shikha Chirantony (eternal flame) symbolizing the eternity of Bengali nationalism, a mural based on the struggle for independence and other ancillary facilities. There is also a 155-seat auditorium in the complex. The focal point in the experience of the space is the monument, Tower of Light which is a 50-meter high tower composed of stacked glass panels. The museum is situated beneath the tower of light. The museum's plaza area has a 5669 square meter of tiled floor. Its underground terrace has a fountain at the center where water is falls from over the ceiling. Bangladeshi architects Kashef Mahboob Chowdhury and Marina Tabassum won a national design competition in 1997 and subsequently they were commissioned for the project. The total construction cost of the complex was 1.75 billion tk.

Exhibition
The museum has a collection of over 300 historic photographs in 144 glass panels that depict the history of Bangladesh. Terracotta, pictures and paper clippings of the war of liberation is on display at the museum. Copies of foreign newspapers and reports showing different events of war of liberation are kept in the gallery. The gallery also showcases some of the significant archaeological sites and monuments of Bangladesh. A replica of the table, where the eastern zone commander of Pakistan Army Lieutenant General Amir Abdullah Khan Niazi signed the surrender document, is kept in the gallery.

Images

References

External links

Museums in Dhaka
Decorative arts museums
Tourist attractions in Dhaka
Culture in Dhaka
Museums established in 2015
2015 establishments in Bangladesh